Chetverikovo is a rural locality (a village) in Zheleznodorozhnoye Rural Settlement, Sheksninsky District, Vologda Oblast, Russia. The population was 14 as of 2002.

Geography 
Chetverikovo is located 16 km southwest of Sheksna (the district's administrative centre) by road. Pacha is the nearest rural locality.

References 

Rural localities in Sheksninsky District